Maud Winifred Kimbell Sherwood (1880–1956) was a notable New Zealand artist, exhibiting at the New Zealand Academy of Fine Arts, the Royal Academy of Arts, London and the Paris Salon.

Biography
Kimbell was born in Dunedin, Otago, New Zealand in 1880. In the 1890s her family moved to Wellington. She studied art at the Wellington Technical College and was taught by James Nairn, Mary Tripe and Mabel Hill.

Kimbell traveled and studied in Europe from 1911 through 1913. Upon leaving Europe she settled in Australia

In 1917 she married Alfred Charles Sherwood whom she divorced in 1922. In 1925 she returned to New Zealand, traveling back to Europe in 1926 where she stayed and exhibited for seven years, including and exhibition at the Royal Academy of Arts.

Sherwood returned to Australia in 1933 where she was awarded the Coronation Medal in 1937 and an Australian 150th Anniversary Exhibition Medal in 1938. She was a member of the Society of Artists..., Sydney.

She died December 1, 1956 in Katoomba, Australia 

Public collections in both New Zealand and Australia hold her paintings.

Gallery

References

External links
Works by Sherwood held at Museum of New Zealand Te Papa Tongarewa
Works by Sherwood held at the Auckland Art Gallery

1880 births
1956 deaths
New Zealand women artists
Artists from Dunedin